Chris Sullivan (born 3 November 1988) is an Australian footballer who plays as a defender for Far North Queensland. He also played for Greek side Odysseas Kordelio F.C. and Apollon Kalamarias F.C..

References

1988 births
Living people
Australian soccer players
Association football defenders
Apollon Pontou FC players
FK Beograd (Australia) players